Korean table d'hôte, called han-jeongsik in Korean, is a Korean-style full-course meal characterized by the array of small banchan plates in varied colours.

See also 
 Bap (rice)
 Guk (soup)
 Banchan (side dishes)
 Table d'hôte
 Meze (Middle Eastern/Balkan meal)
 Smörgåsbord (Scandinavian meal)
 Thali (South and Southeast Asian meal)

References 

Korean cuisine
Meals
Courses (food)